{|

{{Infobox ship career
|Hide header=
|Ship country=United States
|Ship flag=
|Ship name=USS Brennan 
|Ship namesake=John Joseph Brennan
|Ship ordered=
|Ship builder=Mare Island Navy Yard
|Ship laid down=28 February 1942
|Ship launched=22 August 1942 as HMS Bentinck (BDE-13)|Ship acquired=
|Ship commissioned=20 January 1943 as USS Brennan (DE-13)|Ship decommissioned=9 October 1945
|Ship in service=
|Ship out of service=
|Ship struck=24 October 1945
|Ship reinstated=
|Ship sponsor=
|Ship reclassified=
|Ship honors=
|Ship identification=DE-13
|Ship fate=Sold for scrap in 1946
|Ship notes=
}}

|}USS Brennan (DE-13) was an  constructed for the United States Navy during World War II and commissioned in January 1943.  She performed anti-submarine and anti-aircraft convoy protection duties in North Atlantic Ocean waters, and was decommissioned in October 1945 at New York Navy Yard and scrapped in 1946.

Namesake
John Joseph Brennan was born on 14 June 1920 in Philadelphia. He attended that LaSalle College and earned a BA degree before enlisting in the United States Naval Reserve on 6 July 1940. He trained on the former battleship  before he terminated his enlistment to accept an appointment as a midshipman in the Naval Reserve on 10 August 1940. Brennan was a member of the first class to be educated at the Naval Reserve Midshipman's School, New York.

After serving on Quincy for almost a year, he was detached on 15 December 1941 to join Armed Guard Crew Number 34 at the Armed Guard Center, New York. He reported for duty on 20 December 1941 and on 31 December 1941, received orders detailing him to command the armed guard unit of the freighter Otho. On 3 April 1942, while the ship steamed alone off the eastern seaboard,   torpedoed and sank Otho. Ensign Brennan was among those killed.

Construction and commissioning
Brennan was laid down on 28 February 1942 at the Mare Island Navy Yard as British destroyer escort Bentinck (BDE-13); launched on 22 August 1942; reallocated to the United States early in January 1943; renamed Brennan' on 6 January 1943; and commissioned on 20 January 1943.

Service history

World War II
Following shakedown training off southern California, Brennan arrived in Miami, Florida on 4 March, to serve as a training ship for student officers and prospective crews of destroyer escorts. She operated in the Florida Strait and in the West Indies for the remainder of her career, frequently touching at ports in Haiti, Jamaica, and Cuba. The damage to Brennans superstructure was repaired in July when she had an availability in Charleston, South Carolina.

On 15 September 1945 Brennan'' sailed to the New York Navy Yard to be prepared for inactivation. She was decommissioned there on 9 October, and her name was struck from the Navy list on 24 October 1945. She was sold for scrap in July 1946.

Awards

References

External links
 NavSource Online: Destroyer Escort Photo Archive - USS Brennan (DE-13)

World War II frigates and destroyer escorts of the United States
Evarts-class destroyer escorts
Ships built in Vallejo, California
1942 ships